People v(s). Hernandez may refer to:

 People of California v. Hernandez (1964)
 People of the Philippines vs. Hernandez (1956)